Ukanc is a settlement near Lake Bohinj in the Municipality of Bohinj in the Upper Carniola region of Slovenia. It is southwest of the lake. The majority of buildings in the settlement are either hotels or holiday houses.

Geography
Ukanc is a scattered settlement on a shady rolling plain at the west end of Lake Bohinj at the end of the valley, where mountain walls rise on three sides, closed in by Mount Vogel, Little Peak (Mali vrh), Mount Peršivec, and the Komarča Cliff. It is connected by road to Bohinjska Bistrica. The soil largely consists of alluvium from the Ukanc Suha River (Ukanška Suha) and Žagar Gorge (Žagarjev graben), as well as the Savica River. In meteorological terms, Ukanc is one of the wettest places in Slovenia.

Name
Ukanc was attested in written sources in 1498 under various names: Vkanes, Vkentzi, Vkantzich, Nakonczi, Vkonczich, and Vkansczich. The name is a fused dialect form of the prepositional phrase v konec 'to/at the end', referring to its location at the end of the Bohinj Basin.

Cemetery

An Austro-Hungarian cemetery with a wooden chapel is in Ukanc, near the former Isonzo front of the First World War.

Mass grave

Ukanc is the site of a former mass grave associated with the Second World War. The Ukanc Mass Grave was located on the west shore of Lake Bohinj. It contained the remains of Croatian victims and has been exhumed.

References

External links

Ukanc at Geopedia

Populated places in the Municipality of Bohinj